Alexandru Nicolae Vlad (born 6 December 1989) is a Romanian professional footballer who plays as a left back or a central defender for Liga I club FC Voluntari.

Career

Dnipro 
On 4 July 2013, Vlad signed a deal with Ukrainian team FC Dnipro Dnipropetrovsk for an undisclosed fee.

Honours

Club
Dnipro Dnipropetrovsk
UEFA Europa League runner-up: 2014–15

CFR Cluj
Liga I: 2017–18

FC Voluntari
Cupa României runner-up: 2021–22

Notes

External links

Living people
People from Sighetu Marmației
1989 births
Romanian footballers
Romanian expatriate footballers
Association football defenders
Liga I players
Liga II players
Ukrainian Premier League players
AFC Săgeata Năvodari players
FC Internațional Curtea de Argeș players
CS Pandurii Târgu Jiu players
FC Dnipro players
CFR Cluj players
FC Voluntari players
Romanian expatriate sportspeople in Ukraine
Expatriate footballers in Ukraine